Polygrammodes faraonyalis is a moth in the family Crambidae. It was described by Viette in 1954. It is found in Madagascar.

References

Spilomelinae
Moths described in 1954
Moths of Madagascar